Colonel General Yuriy Vsyevolodovich Votintsev (23 October 1919 – 29 November 2005) was a commander of the Soviet Air Defense's Missile Defense Units.  He is best known for the revelation in his memoirs in 1998 of the 1983 incident involving Stanislav Petrov in which the latter probably prevented an inadvertent nuclear war between the United States and the former Soviet Union.

Biography 
He was born October 23, 1919 in Tashkent, Uzbekistan, to Vsyevolod Dimitrievich and Anastasia Alexandrovna (Shcheglova) Votintsev, his father reportedly killed by English and/or American agents.  He married Anna Makarovna (Rysakova) Votintsev (b. 1919), with a son, Vsyevolod Yurievich Votintsev (b. 1956), who worked as a military journalist, and a daughter, Marina Yuryevna Votintseva (b. 1959), a military foreign linguist.

Career 
Votintsev was a promoted and repeatedly decorated artillery officer throughout World War II.  Toward 1953 he was lending his experience to North Korean and Chinese forces during the Korean War.  He went on to serve in antiaircraft and space defense, becoming an artillery Major General in 1958 and transferring to Turkmenistan, working with southern border defense to suppress American U-2 surveillance flights.  He became a lieutenant general in 1963 and a Turkmen delegate to the 22nd and 23rd CPSU Party Congresses.  He headed interdepartmental technical commissions and was made a Hero of Soviet Labor by the Supreme Soviet of the Soviet Union, as well as given an Order of Lenin and Hammer and Sickle gold medal at the hand of Dimitri Ustinov.  After retirement he was the veteran's organization chair for the capital's Oktyabrskiy region and was chosen as a delegate to the 1990 28th Congress of the CPSU.  He holds two Orders of Lenin, four Orders of the Red Banner, an Order of Alexander Nevsky, and two first-degree Orders of the Patriotic War (World War II), Red Star Orders, and Emblem of Honor (Znak Pochyota) medals.

Votintsev resided in Moscow.

External links 
"Lyudi" (People):  biographical information in Russian

1919 births
2005 deaths
Military personnel from Tashkent
Communist Party of the Soviet Union members
Soviet colonel generals
Soviet military personnel of World War II
Soviet military personnel of the Korean War
Heroes of Socialist Labour
Recipients of the Order of Lenin
Recipients of the Order of the Red Banner
Recipients of the Order of Alexander Nevsky
Recipients of the Medal of Zhukov
Soviet Air Defence Force officers
Frunze Military Academy alumni
Military Academy of the General Staff of the Armed Forces of the Soviet Union alumni